Mariyam Mukku is a 2015 Indian Malayalam-language romantic fantasy drama written and directed by James Albert. The film marks the directorial debut of screenwriter James. The film was distributed by LJ Films. It stars Fahadh Faasil and Sana Althaf in the lead roles along with Manoj K. Jayan, Joy Mathew, Irshad, Sadiq, Nandhu, Prathap Pothan and Saju Navodaya in other important roles. The film score and songs were composed by Vidyasagar.

The film depicts a love story between Felix, (Fahadh Faasil) and Salomi (Sana Althaf) who live in Mariyam Mukku, a coastal area with a unique Latin Christian culture. The movie was shot at Tangasseri beach in Kollam. The film released on 23 January 2015 on theatres and met with negative reviews from critics.

Cast 

 Fahadh Faasil as Felix
 Sana Althaf as Salomi
 Manoj K. Jayan as Palamukkil Pawlos
 Pratap Pothan as Father Gabriel
 Santhosh Keezhattoor as Bernard, Felix's father
 Joy Mathew as Karamoottil varkey (Salomi's father)
 Aju Varghese as Lloyd Casper Anderson
 Irshad as Kaala George
 Neeraj Madhav as Dennis
 Nandhu as Mullan Joseph
 Nebish Benson as young Felix
 Sadiq as Earnest
 Sreejith Ravi as Lorenze
Kundara Johny as DYSP Paul
 Saju Navodaya as Nazareth
 Devi Ajith as Kathreena
 Suja Menon as Jancy
 Reena Basheer as Clara
 Seema G. Nair as Marykutty
 Veena Nair as Anna
 Meena Ganesh as Mariyamma
 Dinesh Prabhakar as Charlie
Subeesh Sudhi as Chandy
Omana Ouseph as Aleyamma
Kalashala Babu as Wilfred

Production & Casting 
The filming started in October, 2014 and was shot in the locations at Lighthouse, Vizhinjam and Kappil. The shooting was meant to be completed in two schedules, and the film was set to release by 23 January 2015. It was earlier reported that Hima Davis would play the female lead. However, later confirmed that Sana had replaced her in the film. She was earlier seen in Vikramadithyan (2014).

A teaser was released by LJ films on 21 December 2014, following by a second teaser released on 6 January 2015.

Music 

The film features four tracks composed by Vidyasagar. He has composed a different kind of music while retaining his trademark style of melody. All the songs garnered fine appreciation from critics. Ee Kadalinu Kolu, the melodious track brings the feel of rain, storm, sea and love – all blending together, indicating the blossoming of love between the lovers in a monsoon. Kavil, with a Latin-American flavour, has been composed as a folk song recounting how the Portuguese had come and gone. Swargam Thurannu, with its divine feel, it's a Christmas night carol song. Mekkarayil, there is a change happening in the seashore. As the waves come and go, this song even though a fast-paced, gives the feel of each line coming and going.

Reception 
The film received generally negative reviews from critics and ended as a below average grosser at the Kerala box office. It  was an anticipated movie which is the directorial debut of scriptwriter James Albert known for scripting popular Malayalam films. But here, the weak screenplay was the major drawback. The script failed to narrate the theme, which was a blend of realism and fantasy. The plot which develops with the feel of a love story, suddenly takes a complete track change into a fantasy drama. The unbalanced plot left the audience totally clueless about the total intention of the movie.

References

External links
 
 

2010s Malayalam-language films
2015 directorial debut films
2015 films
2010s romantic fantasy films
Films shot in Kollam
Films scored by Vidyasagar
Indian romantic fantasy films
Films about Catholicism
Films about Christianity
Christianity in India
Christianity in Kerala